The 1973 Alabama Crimson Tide football team (variously "Alabama", "UA" or "Bama") represented the University of Alabama in the 1973 NCAA Division I football season. It was the Crimson Tide's 79th overall and 40th season as a member of the Southeastern Conference (SEC). The team was led by head coach Bear Bryant, in his 16th year at his alma mater and 29th overall as a head coach, and played their home games at Denny Stadium in Tuscaloosa and Legion Field in Birmingham, Alabama. They finished season with eleven wins and one loss (11–1 overall, 8–0 in the SEC), as SEC champions and with a loss to Notre Dame in the Sugar Bowl.

Although they lost in the Sugar Bowl, Alabama was recognized as national champions by the Coaches' Poll (UPI) as their selection was made prior to bowl season at the time (the UPI started to issue its final poll after the bowl games beginning in 1974). Notre Dame was awarded the national championship by the Associated Press (AP).

The Crimson Tide opened the season with a victory at Birmingham over California. The next week, they defeated Kentucky in what was Bryant's first game in Lexington since he resigned as head coach of the Wildcats after their 1953 season. After they defeated Vanderbilt for their second shutout of the season, Alabama defeated Georgia in the first Tuscaloosa game of the season and followed that with a victory at Florida before what was the largest crowd to date at Florida Field.

Against Tennessee, Alabama defeated their rivals behind three fourth quarter touchdowns and extended their record to 6–0. The following week, the Crimson Tide shattered numerous offensive records with their 77–6 blowout win over Virginia Tech. After victories over both Mississippi State at Jackson and Miami on homecoming, Alabama then captured their third consecutive SEC championship with their win over LSU. Alabama then closed the season with a win over Auburn in the Iron Bowl to close the regular season, but then lost to Notre Dame in the Sugar Bowl.

Schedule

Source: Rolltide.com: 1973 Alabama football schedule

Game summaries

California

Sources:

As they entered the 1973 season, Alabama was ranked as the No. 6 team in the first AP Poll prior to their season opener against California. Playing in the evening at Legion Field, the Crimson Tide utilized 70 players and set a school record for total offense with this 66–0 shutout of the Golden Bears. Alabama took a 14–0 first quarter lead behind touchdowns scored on a two-yard Wilbur Jackson run and a 32-yard pass from Gary Rutledge to Johnny Sharpless. They then extended their lead to 21–0 at halftime behind a 16-yard touchdown pass from Richard Todd to George Pugh.

The Crimson Tide continued their dominance over the Golden Bears through the second half where they outscored their opponent 45–0. In the third, Alabama scored on a three-yard James Taylor run, a 21-yard Bill Davis field goal and on a 46-yard touchdown pass from Richard Todd to Darrell Owen. In the fourth, Alabama closed with touchdowns on a Harris fumble recovery, and 18-yard run by John Boles and runs of 32 and five-yards by Willie Shelby. The 667 yards of total offense set a new school record and the 66 points were the most scored by the Crimson Tide since their 66–0 victory over Richmond in 1961. The victory improved Alabama's all-time record against California to 1–1.

Kentucky

Sources:

After their victory over California to open the season, Alabama moved from the No. 6 to No. 4 position in the AP Poll prior to their game at Kentucky. In what was Bear Bryant's first game at Lexington since he resigned as the Wildcats head coach following their 1953 season, the Crimson Tide came from behind and won 28–14. After a scoreless first quarter, Kentucky took a 14–0 halftime lead behind second quarter touchdowns on a four-yard Sonny Collins run and a 14-yard Ernie Lewis pass to Jack Alvarez.

The Crimson Tide started their comeback on the first play of the third quarter when Willie Shelby returned the second half kickoff 100-yards for a touchdown. Touchdown runs of three-yards by Wilbur Jackson and six-yards by Gary Rutledge gave Alabama a 21–14 lead as they entered the fourth quarter. In the fourth, Shelby scored his second touchdown on a two-yard run that made the final score 28–14. The victory improved Alabama's all-time record against Kentucky 26–1–1.

Vanderbilt

Sources:

After their closer than expected victory over Kentucky, Alabama dropped into the No. 5 position in the AP Poll prior to their game against Vanderbilt. Against the Commodores, the Crimson Tide scored on eight of their eleven offensive possessions en route to a 44–0 shutout at Nashville. Alabama took a 17–0 lead in the first quarter behind a 14-yard Gary Rutledge touchdown pass to Wayne Wheeler, a 35-yard Bill Davis field goal and a 13-yard Randy Billingsley touchdown run. They then extended their lead to 27–0 at halftime behind a 13-yard Mike Stock touchdown run and a 22-yard Davis field goal as time expired in the second quarter.

Alabama closed the game with a four-yard Ellis Beck touchdown run and 34-yard Davis field goal in the third and a one-yard Stock run in the fourth for the 44–0 win. The game marked the first time Bryant coached against his former quarterback Steve Sloan who was the Commodores. The victory improved Alabama's all-time record against Vanderbilt to 30–17–4.

Georgia

Sources:

After their victory over Vanderbilt, Alabama moved into the No. 3 position in the AP Poll prior to their game against Georgia. Playing in their first Denny Stadium game of the season, the Crimson Tide came-from-behind and defeated the Bulldogs 28–14 at Tuscaloosa. After each team traded first quarter field goals, Alabama took a 13–3 halftime lead behind an eight-yard Randy Billingsley touchdown run and a 39-yard Bill Davis field goal in the second quarter. In the third, Georgia cut the lead to 13–5 after Kirk Price blocked a Greg Gantt punt out of the endzone for a safety.

The Bulldogs next scored early in the fourth on a 37-yard Allan Leavitt field goal and on an eight-yard Jimmy Poulos touchdown run and took a 14–13 lead. Alabama retook the lead late in the fourth on an eight-yard Gary Rutledge touchdown run. Their defense then forced four consecutive Georgia incompletions on the possession that ensued. Billingsley then gave the Crimson Tide the 28–14 win with his 17-yard run in the final minute of the game. The victory improved Alabama's all-time record against Georgia to 30–19–4.

Florida

Sources:

After their victory over Georgia, Alabama retained their No. 3 position in the AP Poll prior to their game against Florida. Before what was then the largest crowd in the history of Florida Field, the Crimson Tide defeated the Gators 35–14 at Gainesville. Alabama took a 7–0 lead in the first quarter after Tyrone King recovered a blocked punt in the endzone for a touchdown. They then extended their lead to 21–0 with second quarter touchdown runs from one-yard by Richard Todd and 11-yards by Calvin Culliver.

Down by three scores, the Gators rallied with a pair of David Bowden touchdown passes that cut the Crimson Tide lead to 21–14 by the third quarter. The first was from 16-yards to Lee McGriff and the second from two-yards to Thomas Clifford. Alabama then closed the game with fourth quarter touchdown runs of 13-yards from Culliver and six-yards by Wilbur Jackson for the 35–14 win. The victory improved Alabama's all-time record against Florida to 13–5.

Tennessee

Sources:

After their victory over Florida, Alabama moved into the No. 2 position and Tennessee moved into the No. 10 position in the AP Poll prior to their game at Legion Field. Against the Volunteers, the Crimson Tide scored three touchdowns in the final quarter of the game for a 42–21, victory at Birmingham before a nationally televised audience. Alabama opened the game with an 80-yard Gary Rutledge touchdown pass to Wayne Wheeler for a 7–0 lead on their first offensive possession. After Wilbur Jackson extended their lead to 14–0 with his seven-yard run, Tennessee scored their first points on a 20-yard Condredge Holloway pass to John Yarbrough that made the score 14–7 at the end of the first. The Crimson Tide next took a 21–14 lead into halftime after Richard Todd threw an 11-yard touchdown pass to Willie Shelby and Holloway scored on a six-yard run for the Vols.

Tennessee then managed to tie the game 21–21 with the lone third quarter points on a 64-yard Holloway touchdown pass to Mitchell Gravitt. Alabama responded with three fourth quarter touchdowns en route to the 42–21 win. the first came on a 64-yard Robin Cary punt return, an 80-yard Wilbur Jackson run and a three-yard Paul Spivey run. The victory improved Alabama's all-time record against Tennessee to 26–23–7.

Virginia Tech

Sources:

After their victory over Tennessee, Alabama retained their No. 2 position prior to their out of conference match-up against Virginia Tech at Denny Stadium. Against the Gobblers, the Crimson Tide set several team, conference and national offensive records with this 77–6 blowout at Tuscaloosa. Alabama opened the game with a pair of first quarter touchdown runs from 51-yards by Wilbur Jackson and two-yards from Randy Billingsley for a 14–0 lead. In the second, the Crimson Tide extended their lead to 35–0 after Ralph Stokes scored on a seven-yard run, Conley Duncan recovered a fumble in the endzone and Richard Todd threw a 28-yard touchdown pass to Darrell Owen before the Hokies scored their only points of the contest. With just under a minute to play in the first half, Phil Rogers scored Tech's only points with his six-yard touchdown run. However, Alabama responded on their next offensive play with an 80-yard James Taylor touchdown run for a 42–6 halftime lead.

The Crimson Tide continued their scoring into the second half with another four touchdowns in the third quarter. They came on runs of seven-yards by Billingsley, nine-yards by Todd, 14-yards by Jack O'Rear and 86-yards by Calvin Culliver. O'Rear then scored the final points of the game with his 28-yard touchdown run in the fourth that made the final score 77–6. Records set in the game included the most total offensive yards in SEC history with 828 and the most rushing yards in NCAA history for a single game with 743. The 828 yards of total offense for the game also eclipsed the previous record of 667 yards set against California to open the season, and the 77 points also represented the first time the Crimson Tide reached 70 points in a game since their 1945 season. Additionally, four Alabama backs rushed for over 100 yards with 142 yards from Taylor, 138 from Jackson, 127 yards from Culliver and 102 yards from Todd. The victory improved Alabama's all-time record against Virginia Tech to 8–0.

Mississippi State

Sources:

As they entered their game against Mississippi State, Alabama retained their No. 2 position in the AP Poll. Favored by 28 points as they entered the game, the Crimson Tide shutout the Bulldogs 35–0 at Jackson. On the second offensive play of the game, Alabama took a 7–0 lead behind a 38-yard Randy Billingsley touchdown run. State then held the Crimson Tide to only a pair of Bill Davis field goals from 33 and 27-yards for a 13–0 Alabama lead at halftime.

The Crimson Tide then closed the game with three second half touchdowns for the 35–0 win. Willie Shelby scored on a 29-yard run in the third and Wilbur Jackson and Ralph Stokes scored on runs of six and one-yard in the fourth. In the game, Sam Nichols missed a pair of field goals for the Bulldogs from 30 and 32-yards that would have prevented the shutout. The victory improved Alabama's all-time record against Mississippi State to 45–10–3.

Miami

Sources:

As they entered their game against Miami, Alabama retained their No. 2 position in the AP Poll for a fourth consecutive week. On homecoming in Tuscaloosa, Alabama defeated Hurricanes 43–13 and after the victory accepted an invitation to compete in the Sugar Bowl. Alabama scored their first points early in the game when Greg Montgomery blocked a Miami punt out of the endzone for a safety. They then extended their lead to 15–0 by the end of the first behind a two-yard Gary Rutledge run and a 69-yard Rutledge pass to John Sharpless. Willie Shelby then made the halftime score 22–0 with his 52-yard punt return.

Miami scored their first points early in the third on a three-yard Woody Thompson touchdown run. However, Alabama responded later in the quarter with a nine-yard Rutledge touchdown pass to Darrell Owen and made the score 29–6. In the final quarter, the Crimson Tide closed with a five-yard James Taylor touchdown run and a 62-yard John Boles punt return. The Hurricanes then scored the final points of the game on a 78-yard Coy Hall touchdown pass to Steve Marcantonio that made the final score 43–13. The victory improved Alabama's all-time record against Miami to 10–2.

LSU

Sources:

After their victory over Miami, Alabama retained their No. 2 position and LSU was in the No. 7 position in the AP Poll prior to their match-up at Baton Rouge on Thanksgiving Day. Playing in a regionally televised game on ABC, Alabama defeated the previously undefeated Tigers 21–7 and secured both the 500th win in the history of Crimson Tide football and captured the 1973 conference championship. After a scoreless first quarter, Alabama took a 14–0 halftime lead with a pair of touchdowns in the second quarter. The first came on a 19-yard Gary Rutledge run and the second on a 49-yard Rutledge pass to George Pugh.

In the third, the Crimson Tide extended their lead to 21–0 after Rutledge threw a 77-yard touchdown pass to Wayne Wheeler. LSU answered early in the fourth with their only points on a 40-yard Brad Davis run that made the final score 21–7. The victory improved Alabama's all-time record against LSU to 23–10–4.

Auburn

Sources:

As they entered their annual rivalry game against Auburn, Alabama moved into the No. 1 position in the AP Poll prior to their match-up in the Iron Bowl. Seeking to avenge their loss from the previous season to the Tigers the Crimson Tide were dominant in this 35–0 shutout at Legion Field. Alabama took a 14–0 lead in the first quarter behind touchdown runs of seven-yards by Randy Billingsley and of one-yard by Gary Rutledge.

After a scoreless second, Rutledge scored his second rushing touchdown early in the third on a three-yard run for a 21–0 lead. The Crimson Tide then closed the game with touchdown runs of 14-yards by Wilbur Jackson and eight-yards by James Taylor for the 35–0 win. The victory improved Alabama's all-time record against Auburn to 20–17–1.

Notre Dame

Sources:

At the conclusion of the regular season, Alabama was selected as national champions in the UPI Coaches' Poll. However, the Crimson Tide would not win the AP championship as they lost 24–23 against Notre Dame in what was a classic Sugar Bowl.

Notre Dame checked into the locker room at halftime up 14–10, the big play coming on a 93-yard kickoff return for a touchdown by Al Hunter. Each team scored a touchdown in the third quarter, that left the Irish up 21–17 going into the fourth.  Alabama took a 23–21 lead on a fleaflicker touchdown pass from running back Mike Strock back to quarterback Richard Todd. However, Bill Davis missed the extra point and Alabama was up by only two. Notre Dame drove the ball downfield and kicked a 19-yard field goal to go up 24–23 with 4:26 to go.  Bama could not answer, but the punt left Notre Dame backed up to their own goal.  With time ticking away and Notre Dame facing a third and eight, Alabama had a chance to get the ball back in excellent field position, but Irish QB Tom Clements threw a 35-yard pass to tight end Robin Webber and Notre Dame held on to win the game and the AP national championship.

NFL Draft
Several players that were varsity lettermen from the 1973 squad were drafted into the National Football League (NFL) in the 1974, 1975 and 1976 drafts. These players included:

Roster

References
General

 
 
 

Specific

Alabama
Alabama Crimson Tide football seasons
College football national champions
Southeastern Conference football champion seasons
Alabama Crimson Tide football